Thure Johansson (1886–1970) was a Swedish long-distance runner who is credited by the International Association of Athletics Federations for setting a world's best of 2:40:34 in the marathon on August 31, 1909. Johansson's record was reportedly set on a 368-meter indoor track at the Idrottsparken Velodrome Marathon in Stockholm, Sweden.

Competing against American Jim Crowley and Canadian Hans Holmer at the 69th Regiment Armory in New York City, Johansson broke Dorando Pietri's indoor record for the marathon on March 1, 1910 (2:36:55.2).
 As of May 2010, the Association of Road Racing Statisticians notes that Johansson's mark still stands as the sixth fastest time on an indoor track. The following month, Johansson soundly defeated Crowley in a match race at Celtic Park in New York City.

Johansson was trained and managed by Swedish-born Ernie Hjertberg, coach of the Irish American Athletic Club and a prior US track and field champion.

Notes

References

1886 births
1970 deaths
Swedish male long-distance runners
World record setters in athletics (track and field)